Cherryburn is a cottage in Mickley, Northumberland, England. It was the birthplace of Thomas Bewick, an English wood engraver and ornithologist. The cottage, its adjacent farmhouse and large grounds, have been managed by the National Trust since 1991 when they took over responsibility for the site from the Bewick Birthplace Trust.  Cherryburn is open to the public 7 days a week between February and November.

History 

Thomas Bewick was born in the cottage in August 1753, he grew up there until the age of 14 when he moved to Newcastle upon Tyne to become a bound apprentice with the Beilby family.

The Cottage and the Farmhouse are now a museum to show what life was back when Thomas Bewick was alive. The Cottage has been furnished with items which would have been common at the time and the Farmhouse possesses a large collection of Bewick's publications, original engravings and printing equipment.

References

External links
Cherryburn's entry on the National Trust website

Historic house museums in Northumberland
Art museums and galleries in Northumberland
Biographical museums in Northumberland
National Trust properties in Northumberland
Prudhoe